The Kirkland and District Hospital is a public hospital established in 1975 to serve Kirkland Lake, Ontario, Canada and area.

The hospital has a total of 62 beds, including 6 intensive care, 2 obstetrics, 39 medical/surgical and 15 chronic beds plus 280 full-time and part-time staff. Departmental laboratories include haematology, chemistry, blood bank and cryogenics sections and referred out microbiology, cytology and pathology services as well as diagnostic services including echocardiography, pulmonary function testing, exercise stress testing, radiography, mammography, ultrasound, doppler facilities and fetal monitoring capabilities.

Kirkland and District Hospital is part of the NORTH Network, a telemedicine network affiliated with Lady Minto Hospital in Cochrane, Timmins and District Hospital and the Sunnybrook Health Sciences Centre in Toronto.

History 

The first hospital opened in Kirkland Lake was the Kirkland Lake Red Cross Hospital, in 1926.  Subsequently, the old Kirkland & District Hospital was built sometime around the 1940s on 2nd Street, across from the Kirkland Lake Collegiate & Vocational Institute. The hospital was partially financed by the prospector William Henry "Bill" Wright, who donated money to build the east wing of the hospital which bore his name.

The present day Kirkland and District Hospital opened October 15, 1975, by Orval L. Archer (one of the former presidents of the hospital board). The hospital was originally equipped with 132 beds, but downsized to the present 62 beds. In October 2020, the Kirkland & District Hospital amalgamated with the Englehart & District Hospital, under the Blanche River Health system.

The Kirkland site is associated with several Ontario colleges and universities, including the Northern Ontario School of Medicine (NOSM), The University of Toronto School of Medicine, Nipissing University, College Boreal (DI), Northern College.

References

External links 
 Kirkland and District Hospital Programs and Services

Hospital buildings completed in 1976
Hospitals established in 1976
Hospitals in Ontario
1976 establishments in Ontario
Kirkland Lake